Isoa Ulago Domolailai (born Sigatoka, 13 January 1981) is a Fijian rugby union footballer. He plays as a lock.

Career
He currently plays for Tarbes in France. Domolailai's first game for Fiji was on 10 November 2001, in a 10-66 loss to Italy. He missed the 2003 Rugby World Cup finals, due to an injury, but was selected again for the 2007 Rugby World Cup finals. He played, as a substitute, in the 12-55 loss to Australia, on 23 September 2007. He wasn't selected since then. Domolailai currently holds 13 caps for the Fijian Squad, having yet to score his first points.

External links
 Tarbes profile
 Fiji profile
 Pacific Islanders profile
 Scrum profile

1981 births
Living people
Fijian rugby union players
Rugby union locks
Fiji international rugby union players
Pacific Islanders rugby union players
Fijian expatriate rugby union players
Expatriate rugby union players in New Zealand
Expatriate rugby union players in France
Expatriate rugby union players in Italy
Fijian expatriate sportspeople in New Zealand
Fijian expatriate sportspeople in France
Fijian expatriate sportspeople in Italy
People from Sigatoka
I-Taukei Fijian people